Coprinopsis ephemeroides is a species of agaric fungus in the family Psathyrellaceae. First described as Agaricus ephemeroides by Swiss botanist Augustin Pyramus de Candolle in 1805, it was transferred to the genus Coprinopsis in 2010 by Gabriel Moreno.

See also
List of Coprinopsis species

References

External links

ephemeroides
Fungi described in 1805
Fungi of North America